The Insurance and Pensions Authority or IPA was the statutory body responsible for the regulation and supervision of pensions and insurance businesses operated in or from the Isle of Man. In 2015, the IPA merged with the Financial Supervision Commission (FSC) to form the Financial Services Authority (IOMFSA).

History
It was first established as the Insurance Authority in 1986. In 1997, its remit was expanded to include oversight of businesses providing pensions and similar products, and it was renamed the Insurance and Pensions Authority.

Remit
Its remit was to authorise and supervise those businesses carrying on these activities, either in or from the Island. It also oversaw general insurance brokers. (Those brokers advising on or arranging "long term insurance", for example, life policies which offer investment benefits, were supervised by the island's other financial services regulator, the Financial Supervision Commission).

In addition the IPA administered the Isle of Man's compensation scheme, which is intended to provide protection for policyholders if a life assurance company should be unable to meet its liabilities.

Chairmen
Clare Christian MHK, 1986-1987
Jim Cain FCA MHK, 1987-1988
Norman Radcliffe MLC, 1988-2002
Donald Gelling CBE, 2002-2012
Peter Pell-Hilley, 2012-2015

Chief Executives
Dr Bill Hastings, 1987–2001
David Vick, 2002–2015

Mission statement
The IPA's mission statement is as follows:

''The IPA exists to maintain and develop an effective regulatory framework for insurance and pension business which will:- 
Provide security for investors
Prevent and deter the Isle of Man being used for the purposes of financial crime
Preserve the international reputation of the Isle of Man
Ensure a flourishing environment for Isle of Man business

Objectives
Its objectives are:

To ensure that the Authority's policies are up to date and implemented in a timely fashion
To resource the Authority with staff of high quality, integrity and experience
To maintain high standards in the authorisation, supervision and good conduct of insurance business
To maintain a cost-effective support system which, appropriate to needs, is sufficient to support the regulatory and other responsibilities of the authority
Without compromising regulatory impartiality, to safeguard the Authority's and the Island's image

Legislative base
The primary legislation from which the IPA derived its powers included:

 The Insurance Act 1986
 The Retirement Benefits Schemes Act 2000

In addition the IPA oversaw implementation of the Anti Money Laundering Standards, secondary legislation which sets out how businesses regulated by it must conduct themselves in order to prevent their being used by money launderers or for terrorist finance.

References

External links
 http://www.gov.im/IPA/

Government of the Isle of Man
Isle of Man
Insurance regulation
Pension regulation